Josia mononeura is a moth of the  family Notodontidae. It is found in southeastern Brazil, Uruguay and northern Argentina.

External links
Species page at Tree of Life project

Notodontidae of South America
Moths described in 1806